The following is a list of Icelandic flags.

National flag and State flag

Governmental flags

Military flag

Historical flags

Unofficial flags

Yacht club flags of Iceland

Political flags

See also
 Flag of Iceland
 Coat of arms of Iceland

References

External links

National symbols of Iceland
Lists and galleries of flags
Flags